Bombus variabilis is a critically endangered species of cuckoo bumblebee. 

B. variabilis is a parasitic species. Females kill and replace the queens of B. pensylvanicus, taking over their nests in the process. The decline of the latter as hosts can partially be linked to the decline of B. variabilis. This species of bee can be distinguished by the lack of pollen baskets. The bee features have a dark face with yellow hair in its vertex and with dark brown wings. Its thorax has variations between black spots or patches. For females, they only have black abdomens but males can vary in their hair color patterns.

References

Bumblebees
Insects described in 1872